A historical event can be defined as any occurrence from the past regardless of significance, with the term "history" an umbrella term relating to past events and any associated memories, discoveries, collections, organizations, presentations, and/or interpretations of them. This differs from a historic event which is often less inclusive, and stands out as having made a significant impact on history itself.

The following is a list of notable people documented as the last living individuals to have witnessed, survived or participated in significant historical events or who were the last living members of a historic group that directly contributed to such an event (e.g. Manhattan Project scientists). Excluded from this list are last living survivors of wars, speakers of languages, and others who are already recorded on pages representing more narrow categories.

Before 1701

1701–1800

1801–1850

1851–1900

1901–1915

1916–1930

1931–1945

1946–1960

1961–1999

2000–present

Images of select individuals
A few of the individuals listed above are pictured here, for visual reference. Each picture is captioned.

See also
 List of last known speakers of languages
 List of sole survivors of aviation accidents and incidents
 List of last surviving veterans of military insurgencies and wars
 List of last surviving veterans of military operations
 List of last surviving World War I veterans by country
 List of last surviving World War II veterans
 List of the last surviving American slaves
 List of last surviving Canadian war veterans
 Last European veterans by war
 Last surviving United States war veterans

Notes

References

Last survivors of historical events
Survivors of historical events
Historical events